This is a list of all personnel changes for the 2011 Indian Premier League.

Retirement

Retained players

Auction
The players auction for the 2011 Indian Premier League (fourth season) was held on 8 and 9 January 2011 at the ITC Royal Gardenia, Bangalore. The auction comprised 350 players (reduced from an initial list of 416 players) put for auction in English auction. Each player in the auction pool had a bidding base price under which franchise owners could not bid. Players were allowed to set their base price between $200,000 to $400,000.

There are reports that some teams spent $12 million on players, despite the salary cap being $9 million.

Sold players

Unsold players
The following players remained unsold at the end of the two-day auction.

  Aaron Heal
  Aaron O'Brien
  Adam Voges
  Brendan Drew
  Bryce McGain
  Cameron Borgas
  Chris Hartley
  Daniel Harris
  Dean Brownlie
  Ed Cowan
  Gary Putland
  Glenn Maxwell
  Graham Manou
  Jake Haberfield
  James Faulkner
  Jason Krejza
  Lee Carseldine
  Luke Ronchi
  Mark Cosgrove
  Michael Hill
  Michael Hogan
  Mick Lewis
  Mitchell Starc
  Nathan Reardon
  Nick Buchanan
  Peter George
  Peter Siddle
  Phil Jaques
  Phillip Hughes
  Rhett Lockyear
  Robert Quiney
  Shane Harwood
  Simon Katich
  Stuart Clark
  Tim Armstrong
  Tim Lang
  Tom Beaton
  Trent Copeland
  Xavier Doherty
  Abdur Razzak
  Imrul Kayes
  Junaid Siddique
  Mahmudullah
  Mashrafe Mortaza
  Mohammad Ashraful
  Naeem Islam
  Raqibul Hasan
  Rubel Hossain
  Shafiul Islam
  Shahadat Hossain
  Shahriar Nafees
  Suhrawadi Shuvo
  Syed Rasel
  Tamim Iqbal
  Adam Lyth
  Adrian Shankar
  Ajmal Shahzad
  Andrew Gale
  Anthony McGrath
  Chris Tremlett
  Darren Stevens
  Graeme Swann
  Graham Napier
  Greg Smith
  Ian Bell
  Jack Shantry
  James Anderson
  Joe Denly
  Jonathan Trott
  Luke Wright
  Matt Prior
  Michael Yardy
  Monty Panesar
  Paul Franks
  Paul Horton
  Ravi Bopara
  Ryan Sidebottom
  Sajid Mahmood
  Samit Patel
  Simon Cook
  Steven Croft
  Tim Bresnan
  Tom Smith
  Usman Afzaal
  Wes Durston
  Sourav Ganguly
  V. R. V. Singh
  Wasim Jaffer
  Niall O'Brien
  Tanmay Mishra
  Aaron Redmond
  Andy McKay
  Daryl Tuffey
  Doug Bracewell
  Gareth Hopkins
  Grant Elliott
  Iain O'Brien
  Ian Butler
  Jacob Oram
  Jamie How
  Kane Williamson
  Kieran Noema-Barnett
  Kyle Mills
  Lou Vincent
  Martin Guptill
  Neil Broom
  Peter Ingram
  Rob Nicol
  Shanan Stewart
  Ahmed Amla
  André Nel
  Andrew Puttick
  CJ de Villiers
  Craig Thyssen
  David Miller
  Dillon du Preez
  Ethan O'Reilly
  Farhaan Behardien
  Gulam Bodi
  Henry Davids
  Herschelle Gibbs
  Jacques Rudolph
  Johann Louw
  Justin Kemp
  Justin Ontong
  Lonwabo Tsotsobe
  Loots Bosman
  Makhaya Ntini
  Mark Boucher
  Morne van Wyk
  Neil McKenzie
  Paul Harris
  Richard Cameron
  Robin Peterson
  Rory Kleinveldt
  Ryan McLaren
  Tyron Henderson
  Vaughn van Jaarsveld
  Vernon Philander
  Yusuf Abdulla
  Zander de Bruyn
  Ajantha Mendis
  Akalanka Ganegama
  Angelo Perera
  Chamara Kapugedera
  Chamara Silva
  Chaminda Vaas
  Chanaka Welegedara
  Chinthaka Jayasinghe
  Dammika Prasad
  Dilhara Fernando
  Dilhara Lokuhettige
  Dilruwan Perera
  Dinesh Chandimal
  Farveez Maharoof
  Gayan Wijekoon
  Gihan Rupasinghe
  Hasantha Fernando
  Indika de Saram
  Isuru Udana
  Jeevantha Kulatunga
  Jeewan Mendis
  Jehan Mubarak
  Kaushal Lokuarachchi
  Kaushalya Weeraratne
  Mahela Udawatte
  Malinda Warnapura
  Malinga Bandara
  Michael Vandort
  Muthumudalige Pushpakumara
  Nuwan Zoysa
  Rangana Herath
  Sanath Jayasuriya
  Suranga Lakmal
  Tharanga Paranavitana
  Thilan Samaraweera
  Thilan Thushara
  Thilina Kandamby
  Upul Tharanga
  Dwayne Smith
  Fidel Edwards
  Floyd Reifer
  Kemar Roach
  Pedro Collins
  Sulieman Benn
  Tino Best
  Ramnaresh Sarwan
  Shivnarine Chanderpaul
  Devendra Bishoo
  Andre Russell
  Chris Gayle
  Danza Hyatt
  Nikita Miller
  Xavier Marshall
  Lionel Baker
  Runako Morton
  Darren Sammy
  Ricardo Powell
  Adrian Barath
  Brian Lara
  Darren Bravo
  Darren Ganga
  Denesh Ramdin
  Lendl Simmons
  Ravi Rampaul
  Rayad Emrit
  Brendan Taylor
  Chamu Chibhabha
  Colin de Grandhomme
  Elton Chigumbura
  Hamilton Masakadza
  Prosper Utseya
  Ray Price
  Tatenda Taibu
  Tinashe Panyangara

Replacement signings
Many franchises signed players after the IPL auction, as replacement of contracted players who are not available to play due to injuries and national commitments. Under IPL rules, the replacements have to be chosen from the pool of players who went unsold in the January auction, and cannot be paid more than the players they are replacing, though they can be paid less.

See also
 List of 2010 Indian Premier League personnel changes
 2011 Indian Premier League

References

Personnel changes
Indian Premier League personnel changes
Cricket player auction lists